Erin Woodley (born June 6, 1972) was a Canadian competitor in synchronized swimming and Olympic medalist.

Career
Woodley began synchronized swimming at age nine. She found her greatest success with partner Lisa Alexander, they won gold in duet at 1994 Commonwealth Games, silver at the 1994 World Aquatics Championships and a silver medal in duet at the 1995 Pan American Games. Woodley's most notable achievement was being a member of the Canadian team that received a silver medal in the team event at the 1996 Summer Olympics in Atlanta.

Honours
Woodley was inducted into the Etobicoke Sports Hall of Fame in 2005.

References

External links
Etobicoke Sports Hall of Fame profile

1972 births
Living people
Canadian synchronized swimmers
Olympic silver medalists for Canada
Olympic synchronized swimmers of Canada
Swimmers from Mississauga
Synchronized swimmers at the 1996 Summer Olympics
Olympic medalists in synchronized swimming
Medalists at the 1996 Summer Olympics
Commonwealth Games medallists in synchronised swimming
Commonwealth Games gold medallists for Canada
Pan American Games medalists in synchronized swimming
Pan American Games silver medalists for Canada
Synchronized swimmers at the 1995 Pan American Games
Medalists at the 1995 Pan American Games
Synchronised swimmers at the 1994 Commonwealth Games
Medallists at the 1994 Commonwealth Games